Stanley L. London (December 5, 1925 – June 8, 2020) was an American doctor who worked with St. Louis Cardinals players beginning in 1956. The Springfield, Illinois, native became head physician for the team after I. C. Middleman died in 1968. He held this position for 29 seasons and became the team's senior medical adviser in October 1997. London was also team physician for the St. Louis Hawks for 11 seasons.

London received his medical degree from Washington University in St. Louis in 1949. He was a fellow in the American Board of Surgeons and the American College of Surgeons.

Athletic career
London was a top amateur athlete, playing American handball, baseball and basketball. He played both college baseball and college basketball at Washington University, where he was named "Uncanny Stanley" for his performances. He was the first inductee into the Missouri Handball Hall of Fame. He was also a member of the Illinois Basketball Hall of Fame, the Missouri Sports Hall of Fame, the St. Louis Sports Hall of Fame, the Washington University Hall of Fame, and the Missouri Sports Medicine Hall of Fame.

Coaching career
London served as an assistant coach for Washington's basketball team during the 1948–1949 season. In March 1949, he was named the head coach of Washington's baseball team for the remainder of the season.

Personal life
His brother was Norman Sidney London, a locally famous St. Louis attorney, who died on March 1, 2014.

References

Further reading
 St. Louis Cardinals 1987 Media Guide
 St. Louis Cardinals 2001 Media Guide

1925 births
2020 deaths
20th-century physicians
21st-century physicians
American baseball coaches
American baseball players
American men's basketball coaches
American men's basketball players
American physicians
American sports physicians
Physicians from Illinois
Sportspeople from Springfield, Illinois
St. Louis Cardinals personnel
St. Louis Hawks
Washington University Bears baseball players
Washington University Bears men's basketball players
Washington University School of Medicine alumni